is a Japanese footballer currently playing as a forward for Sanfrecce Hiroshima.

Career statistics
.

Notes

References

External links

2001 births
Living people
People from Kasugai, Aichi
Association football people from Aichi Prefecture
Japanese footballers
Japan youth international footballers
Association football forwards
J1 League players
Sanfrecce Hiroshima players